Semde translated as 'mind division', 'mind class' or 'mind series' is the name of one of three scriptural and lineage divisions within Atiyoga, Dzogchen or the Great Perfection which is itself the pinnacle of the ninefold division of practice according to the Nyingma school of Tibetan Buddhism. 

Semde emphasizes the clarity (gsal-ba) or the innate awareness (rig-pa) aspect of the Natural State.

Due to the different approaches of various Dzogchen lineages, three series have developed of which semde is one.  The other two divisions or series are Longdé (Space Series) and Menngagde (Instruction Series).  The Mind Series is attributed to Sri Singha and Vairotsana's lineage

Background
The 'Three Series of Dzogchen' (rdzogs chen sde gsum) are a traditional Tibetan Buddhist classification which divides the teachings of the Nyingma school's Dzogchen tradition into three series, divisions or sections. These three are: the Semde ('Mind Series'), the Longdé ('Space Series') and the Menngagde ('Instruction Series'). Traditional accounts of the Nyingma school attribute this schema to the Indian master Mañjuśrīmitra (c. 8th century). According to Namkhai Norbu, the three series are three modes of presenting and introducing the state of Dzogchen. Norbu states that Mennagde is a more direct form of introduction, Longde is closely associated with symbolic forms of introducing Dzogchen and Semde is more focused on oral forms of introduction. 

According to Instruction Series texts, the Mind Series is based on understanding that one's own mind is the basis of all appearances and that this basis, called mind itself, is empty and luminous. Germano writes that the Mind Series serves as a classification for the earlier texts and forms of Dzogchen "prior to the development of the Seminal Heart movements" which focused on meditations based on tantric understandings of bodhicitta (byang chub kyi sems). This referred to the ultimate nature of the mind, which is empty (stong pa), luminous ('od gsal ba), and pure.

As the Mind Series is related to the first statement of Garab Dorje, Semde texts emphasize the direct introduction method of esoteric transmission, directly introducing the student to nature of mind, including pointing-out instruction of this state and methods for recognizing it.

Texts
The mind class (semde) of Dzogchen was also said to comprise eighteen tantras, although the formulation eventually came to include slightly more. Tantras belonging to the Mind Division include:
 Cuckoo of Spiritual Awareness, Sanskrit: 
 Great Potency, Sanskrit: 
 Great Garuda in Flight
 Refining Gold from Ore
 Great Space Never-Waning Banner Scripture
 Spontaneous Summit Scripture
 King of Space
 Jewel-Encrusted Bliss Ornament 
 All-Encompassing Perfection
 Essence of Bodhicitta
 Infinite Bliss
 Wheel of Life, Sanskrit: 
 Six Spheres
 All-Penetrating Perfection
 Wish-Fulfilling Jewel
 All-Unifying Spiritual Awareness
 Supreme Lord
 The Realization of the True Meaning of Meditation
 Kulayarāja Tantra, Sanskrit: 
 The Marvelous Mind of Enlightenment
 The Ten Concluding Teachings

Another listing drawn from The Lotus Born is:

 All-embodying Jewel Scripture
 All-encompassing Bliss Scripture
 Awareness Cuckoo Scripture
 Epitome of Teachings Scripture
 Great Garuda View Scripture
 Great Space King Scripture
 Great Space Never-Waning Banner Scripture
 Great Strength of Awareness Scripture
 Jewel-Studded Bliss Scripture, Sanskrit: 
 Meditation Accomplishment Scripture
 Nonarising Tilaka Scripture
 Pure Gold on Stone Scripture
 Spontaneous Summit Scripture
 Supreme King Scripture
 Variegated Great Treasury Scripture
 Wheel of Life Scripture
 Wish-fulfilling Jewel Scripture
 Wonderful Wisdom Scripture
Of these, the first five are the "Five Earlier Translated Tantras", translated by Vairotsana. The next thirteen were translated primarily by Vimalamitra. Of the remaining three, the Kunjed Gyalpo is taken to be the primary or root tantra of the Mind Series.

Four yogas
One feature of the semde system is four yogas (where yoga in ). These include:

 śamatha or 'calm abiding',
 vipaśyanā,
 "unbounded wholeness", and
 "spontaneous presence" (Sanskrit:  or). 

These parallel the Four Yogas of Mahamudra.

References

Citations

Works cited

Further reading

External links
 Three Sections of Dzogchen

Dzogchen
Nyingma texts
Tibetan words and phrases